Art Academy is a series of edutainment video games beginning in 2009 with Art Academy. Its most recent release was Disney Art Academy. One of Nintendo's franchises, the series has been released on Nintendo DS, Nintendo 3DS and Wii U.

Gameplay 
The games in the series are training simulations that teach players to draw.

Games

Art Academy 

It was developed by Headstrong Games, and published by Nintendo. Art Academy was originally a two-part training application only available for download via the DSiWare service since 2009. It was later re-released in 2010 as a fully compiled, retail-able DS Game Card with added features, thus also making it available for original Nintendo DS and Nintendo DS Lite users.

Art Academy: Lessons for Everyone! 

Art Academy: Lessons for Everyone!, entitled New Art Academy in Europe and Australia is a 2012 video game for the Nintendo 3DS. It is a sequel to Art Academy for the Nintendo DS. This game is the first in the series to include DLC.

Art Academy: SketchPad 
Art Academy: SketchPad was a Wii U eShop app released in 2013 that allowed players to make more detailed drawings than would normally be allowed on Miiverse. It was planned  to include drawing lessons as well.

Art Academy: Home Studio 
Art Academy: Home Studio, also known as Art Academy: Atelier in PAL regions, was the fourth main entry in the series, released in 2015, and the first one on home consoles. A more full-featured version of the SketchPad app, it contains more lessons.

Pokémon Art Academy 

Pokémon Art Academy is an educational drawing video game  developed by Headstrong Games, published by Nintendo for the Nintendo 3DS. It is a spin-off of the Art Academy series featuring characters from the Pokémon media franchise, and was released in Europe and Australia in July 2014, and North America in October. The game was made available as both a retail and downloadable release from the Nintendo eShop, and is the first 3DS title with built-in Miiverse support for sharing artwork.

Disney Art Academy 

Disney Art Academy is an educational art training video game developed by Headstrong Games, published by Nintendo and released for the Nintendo 3DS handheld game console. It is a spin-off of the Art Academy series centered on Disney and Pixar characters. The first game was announced on the Nintendo Direct for March 3, 2016 and was then released in the following months.

Notes

References 

 
Video game franchises introduced in 2009

ja:絵心教室